Archips expansus is a species of moth of the family Tortricidae. It is found on Java and the Philippines.

References

Moths described in 1941
Archips
Moths of Asia